The Mousetrap and Other Plays is a collection of plays by English crime novelist Agatha Christie, published by G. P. Putnam's Sons on 25 November 1978. The eight plays had been previously published individually between 1944 and 1960, and all but Verdict are adaptations of previously published works by Christie.

Contents

Plays by Agatha Christie
Books of plays
1978 books